My Generation: The Very Best of The Who is one of The Who's many greatest hits collections, released by Polydor Records internationally and MCA Records in the United States in 1996. Its release coincided with the release of the remastered original albums (omitting My Generation for contractual reasons) and thus contained the newly remastered versions of the songs, and some also remixed.

Track listing
All songs written by Pete Townshend except where noted.

"I Can't Explain" – 2:04
1964 single
Producer: Shel Talmy
"Anyway, Anyhow, Anywhere" (Townshend/Roger Daltrey) – 2:40
1965 single
Producer: Shel Talmy
"My Generation" – 3:18
from My Generation, 1965
Producer: Shel Talmy
"Substitute" – 3:47
1966 single
Producer: Pete Townshend
"I'm a Boy" – 2:36
1966 single
Producer: Kit Lambert
"Boris the Spider" (John Entwistle) – 2:27
from A Quick One, 1966
Producer: Kit Lambert
"Happy Jack" – 2:11
from the U.S. release of A Quick One called Happy Jack, 1966
Producer: Kit Lambert
"Pictures of Lily" – 2:45
1967 single
Producer: Kit Lambert
"I Can See for Miles" – 4:21
from The Who Sell Out, 1967
Producer: Kit Lambert
"Magic Bus" – 3:15
1968 UK single; from the U.S. album Magic Bus: The Who on Tour, 1968
Producer: Kit Lambert
"Pinball Wizard" – 3:00
from Tommy, 1969
Producer: Kit Lambert
"The Seeker" – 3:22
1970 single
Producer: Kit Lambert, The Who
"Baba O'Riley" – 5:07
from Who's Next, 1971
Producer: The Who, Glyn Johns
"Won't Get Fooled Again" – 8:32
from Who's Next
Producer: The Who, Glyn Johns
"Let's See Action" – 4:02
1971 single
Produced by The Who; Associate Producer: Glyn Johns
"5:15" – 4:49
from Quadrophenia, 1973
Producer: The Who, Kit Lambert & Glyn Johns
"Join Together" – 4:22
1972 single
Produced by The Who, Associate Producer: Glyn Johns
"Squeeze Box" – 2:40
from The Who by Numbers, 1975
Producer: Glyn Johns
"Who Are You" (Single edit) – 5:02
from Who Are You, 1978
Producer: Glyn Johns & Jon Astley
"You Better You Bet" – 5:37
from Face Dances, 1981
Producer: Bill Szymczyk

Sales chart performance
Album

Certifications

Personnel
Roger Daltrey – lead vocals
John Entwistle – bass guitar, vocals
Kenney Jones – drums, percussion on "You Better You Bet"
Keith Moon – Drums, percussion on all except "You Better You Bet"
Pete Townshend – guitar, synthesizer, keyboards, vocals

Design
 Design & Art Direction by Richard Evans

References

1996 greatest hits albums
Albums produced by Jon Astley
The Who compilation albums
MCA Records compilation albums
Polydor Records compilation albums